Kalischer, also Kalisher or Kaliszer, is a Jewish surname (meaning literally "from Kalisz"). Notable people with the surname include:

 Clemens Kalischer (1921–2018), German photographer in reportage and art photography
 Salomon Kalischer, German composer, pianist, and physicist
 Zvi Hirsch Kalischer, German rabbi and Zionist leader
 Peter Kalischer (1915–1991), American journalist

See also
 Jesse Kalisher, American photographer
 Kalisch